Care Bears: Welcome to Care-a-Lot, also known as Welcome to Care-a-Lot, is an American CGI-animated musical television series based on the Care Bears franchise (in honor of the franchise's 30th anniversary) and produced by American Greetings Properties. Unlike its previous predecessor Care Bears shows, this was AG's first CGI animated "Care Bears" TV series, despite several films in the franchise having been released in the format.

The series first aired on June 2, 2012 on the Hub Network. Previews of each new episode were released weekly on an official channel on YouTube, along with occasional music video or other promotional releases. The series lasted one extended 26-episode season, after which the network underwent a rebranding. The series finale aired on December 8, 2012.

Netflix commissioned a continuation of the series, after the rebranding of The Hub as Discovery Family on October 13, 2014. The continuation, titled Care Bears & Cousins, had its first season released on November 6, 2015, continuing the story of the cast of Welcome to Care-a-Lot and introduces four new series regulars, the titular cousins Brave Heart Lion, Bright Heart Raccoon, Lotsa Heart Elephant and Cozy Heart Penguin. The second season of Care Bears & Cousins was released on Netflix on February 5, 2016.

Synopsis 
Set in Care-a-Lot, a magical land in the clouds, Tenderheart Bear, Cheer Bear, Grumpy Bear, Share Bear, Harmony Bear, Funshine Bear and new playful, curious cub Wonderheart Bear all go on adventures that emphasize messages of caring and sharing. Human children from Earth often visit Care-a-Lot and participate in new adventures and valuable lessons learned. The Care Bears' mischievous King Beastly often attempts to make trouble for the bears.

Characters

Main 
 Tenderheart Bear (voiced by David Lodge) – Tenderheart is the eldest and wisest of the Care Bears. Whether it's advice or understanding, a hug or a nudge, he knows just what kids need to help them share their feelings. His belly badge is perfect for the job: a red heart. The de facto leader of the Care Bears, he was granted the power of teleportation by the Great Giving Bear during the Great Giving Festival. He is Wonderheart Bear's uncle.
 Cheer Bear (voiced by Patty Mattson) – Cheer is the happiest bear in Care-a-Lot. The resident cheerleader, she often displays a go-for-it attitude, makes up encouraging cheers right on the spot, and spreads joy among all who know her. When not helping her friends, she can often be found tending her garden. Her belly badge is a rainbow. She was once a member of the team, "Bear Power".
 Funshine Bear (voiced by Michael Sinterniklaas) – Having fun is Funshine's number one thing. He is active, athletic and competitive when it comes to sports, cycling, skating, surfing, hiking and hang gliding. Nothing makes him happier than hanging out with friends or going on wild adventures. He makes the brightest of his days with sunny optimism and a flair for being fearless. His belly badge reflects this spirit: a smiling, shining sun. He was a member of the team, "Bear Power," and also won the Care Bearathon once.
 Grumpy Bear (voiced by Doug Erholtz) – His sardonic and often sarcastic attitude usually gives way to his caring nature and heart, not unlike the rain cloud and heart shaped raindrops that make up his belly badge. Grumpy likes to remind kids who are having a bad day that they're always loved. He is a master builder and mechanic. He was once a member of the team, "Bear Power," is a sports fan who enjoys watching the "Honey Bowl," and is a big eater.
 Harmony Bear (voiced by Nayo Wallace) – Harmony sings, acts, and plays every instrument. Behind her sassy, sometimes diva-like exterior is a natural leader who is all about encouraging others to do their best, especially through music. Her belly badge depicts a single flower with different colored petals. It has the power to magically fix broken instruments and can also alert her of someone in trouble from a distance. She was once a member of the team "Bear Power".
 Share Bear (voiced by Stephanie Sheh) – If Share has it, she'll share it with anyone. Carefree and loving, Share is happiest whenever she's with her friends, serving tea or baking. Her belly badge depicts two crossed heart-shaped lollipops. She has a penchant for baking treats. She lives in a tree house in the Forest of Feelings.
 Wonderheart Bear (voiced by Michaela Dean) – Although one of the youngest Care Bears, Wonderheart always wants to take part in "big bear" adventures. She's playfully curious and never short on questions. Her belly badge features a heart within hearts motif, though she doesn't initially know its full power. She is often seen carrying a stuffed bunny named Floppy Bunny and is sometimes referred to by the nickname "Little Wonder." Wonderheart was the first all-new character created for Welcome to Care-a-Lot.

Recurring 
 Amigo Bear (voiced by Mark Mercado) – A Vermillion Bear who speaks in Spanglish and runs his own chili shack. His belly badge features an Aztec sun.
 Baby Hugs Bear & Baby Tugs Bear (voiced by Olivia Hack and Stephanie Sheh) – Hugs and Tugs are light pink and light blue Care Bear cubs respectively. Despite being younger than Wonderheart, they develop their belly badge powers before her, being allowed to be members of the Cub Bouts, the junior division of the Belly Badge Bouts. Unlike earlier incarnations of the franchise, Tugs' belly badge now features a red heart inside a yellow star, while Hugs' has a yellow star inside a pink heart. Both Cubs are now seen without their signature diapers.
 Bashful Heart Bear – A sea green Bear who tends to appear in background roles. His belly badge is of a heart peeking out from behind a cloud with a rainbow extending outward. He does not have any speaking roles.
 Bedtime Bear (voiced by Michael Sinterniklaas) – A light blue Bear who is active at night, but sleepy during the day. If he's awakened, he gets even more grouchy than Grumpy and if his blanket is taken, he can sleepwalk to try and find it. His belly badge is of a moon.
 Best Friend Bear (voiced by Olivia Hack) – An orchid Bear who is a member of a Belly Badge Bouts team. She tends to be used in background roles, and her belly badge features a rainbow linking a star to a heart.
 Birthday Bear (voiced by Michael Sinterniklaas) – A brown Bear who likes to celebrate birthdays, and also tends to be used in background roles. His belly badge depicts a cupcake with a candle on top.
 Champ Bear (voiced by Doug Erholtz) – A dark blue Bear who is athletic and excels at every sport, and is a rival to Funshine. His belly badge is a trophy adorned with a star.
 Good Luck Bear (voiced by Peter Anderson, one of the show's producers) – A green Bear who believes that luck is within you, even with his power to provide good luck himself. He tends to be used as background filler, being part of two teams in two episodes - the Belly Badge Bouts and the Bear-a-Lots. He speaks in an Irish accent (the first time the character had such an accent since the DIC series) and has a four leaf clover belly badge.
 Grams Bear (voiced by Jennifer Darling) – A turquoise elder Care Bear. She is portrayed differently and looks different in this series than in previous incarnations of the character, being blue instead of lavender-gray, speaks in a stereotypical southern U.S. regional dialect and accent, wears small glasses on the end of her nose and a pink shawl with yellow hearts around her shoulders, walks with a cane, and having her belly badge power (while retaining the rose tied with a yellow ribbon design) being able to restore other belly badges that are temporarily out of commission.
 Great Giving Bear (voiced by David Lodge) – A red Bear who is the Care-a-Lot equivalent of Santa Claus. He has the ability to teleport to different places which he later teaches Tenderheart, and gives gifts to those who Care. His belly badge features a gift box with a heart inside.
 Laugh-a-Lot Bear (voiced by Stephanie Sheh) – A light-orange Bear who enjoys laughter and making others laugh. She was once a member of the team, "Bear-a-Lots", and is also used as a background character, having only a very minor speaking role. Her belly badge depicts a giggling star.
 Love-a-Lot Bear (voiced by Nayo Wallace) – A magenta pink Bear who enjoys sharing love. She tends to be used as background filler, being part of two teams in two episodes - the Belly Badge Bouts and the Bear-a-Lots. Her belly badge is two overlapping hearts – one red and one pink.
 Secret Bear (voiced by Stephanie Sheh) – A magenta Bear who is known for keeping secrets (hence why she speaks in a whisper). She is the co-detective of the Care Bear Detective Agency and is also used in several background roles. She has a heart-shaped lock belly badge.
 Shiver Me Timbear (voiced by David Lodge) – An orange bear resembling Tenderheart who is a legendary pirate captain and one of Tenderheart's Care Bear ancestors. His belly badge features a heart and crossbones.
 Surprise Bear (voiced by Melissa Mable) – An amethyst purple bear who likes to surprise people. She makes very minor background roles in the series. Her belly badge depicts a star popping out of a heart-stamped jack-in-the-box.
 Sweet Dreams Bear (voiced by Olivia Hack) – A  mauve Bear (pale purple in merchandise) who has the power to send down sweet dreams one by one to each Care Bear and believes that all dreams, good or bad, are a natural part of the dreamscape. Sometimes, her power can be drained by a naturally occurring phenomenon known as the "plainbow," but can be restored using other Care Bears's belly badge powers. She speaks in a Southern American accent and her belly badge depicts a pink crescent moon nestled inside a cloud with a heart on it, which takes the form of a rainbow ray attached to a crescent moon.
 Thanks-a-Lot Bear (voiced by Melissa Mable) – A teal bear who is thankful for anything. She is the co-detective of the Care Bear Detective Agency and is also used in several background roles. Her catchphrase is "Thanks a lot!" and is sometimes said sarcastically. Her belly badge depicts a star riding on a rainbow.
 Wish Bear (voiced by Melissa Mable) – A bright blue bear who enjoys making and granting wishes. Like with Good Luck and Love-a-Lot, she tends to be used as background filler, being part of two teams in two episodes - the Belly Badge Bouts and the Bear-a-Lots. Her belly badge depicts a smiling, shooting starbuddy.

Bears who only appear in the merchandise 
 Friend Bear – An amber bear whose belly badge depicts two crossed sunflowers.
 Hopeful Heart Bear – A light magenta Bear whose belly badge depicts a pink heart encircled by multicolored rays of light.

Other Care-a-Lot Residents 
 King Beastly (voiced by Doug Erholtz) – A mischievous and arrogant beast who wears a crown, he likes to cause trouble in Care-a-Lot, but has natural talent if allowed to shine.
 Beasties (voiced by Michael Sinterniklaas and Doug Erholtz) – Beastly's two minions.

Care Kids 
 Penny (voiced by Katherine Shepler) – A girl who loves high speed.
 Phoebe (voiced by Isabella Briscoe) – A shy girl with a talent for singing.
 Clem (voiced by Sean-Ryan Petersen) – A boy with anger issues, summoned to Care-a-Lot by Beastly.
 Hayden (voiced by Elle Labadie) – A young girl with an interest in baking. Loyal to Share Bear, she will keep quiet even if it means taking the blame for a friend's bad behavior. It is later revealed that she has a twin who is identical in appearance, though hardly identical in personality.
 Jayden (voiced by Katherine Shepler) – A twin of Hayden, she seems to be somewhat more sporty and is at times competitive with Hayden.
 Zack (voiced by Mason Malina) – A boy who is into extreme sports; he visits Care-a-Lot to compete in an annual competition.
 Riley (voiced by Katherine Shepler) – A girl who made things up.
 Olivia (voiced by Zoe Miner) – A girl who sometimes has trouble finding her courage.
Joy (voiced by Rachel Albrecht) – A girl who is upset when her best friend moves away; she swears off friendship, but the Care Bears help her by empathizing with her feelings.
Susan (voiced by Sami Staitman) – A girl with blonde hair who enjoys playing video games, but finds that work can be satisfying when she actually puts forth the effort.
Kaylee (voiced by Olivia Hack) – A girl who moved to a new school from Hawaii. She plays the ukulele, but is being bullied by a girl named Madison.
Madison (voiced by Chiara Zanni) – A girl who plays the guitar. When Kaylee joined her class in her school, she started bullying her because she felt jealous and felt that she had stolen her spotlight by playing the ukulele. Madison's voice actress, Chiara Zanni, was Wish Bear in the previous Care Bears series, Care Bears: Adventures in Care-a-Lot
Peter (voiced by Sam Adler) – A boy who is known to always follow rules and who lives by the guidelines of a written rule book. When he arrives in Care-a-Lot, Funshine Bear and Grumpy Bear encourage him to cut loose and he becomes a rebellious spirit with the declared intent of breaking all of Care-a-Lot's rules. After getting into a troubling situation, he learns an important lesson.
Aiden (voiced by Colin Depaula) – A boy who uses a wheelchair because his legs haven't worked since birth. He enjoys a variety of sporting activities and loves trying out new ones. He prefers for anyone who might have questions about him or his wheelchair to simply ask, rather than avoid him or keep silent.
Isabella (voiced by Katherine Shepler) – A young girl who has issues with responsibility, and only learns about its importance by helping Wonderheart.
Ethan (voiced by Sean-Ryan Petersen) – A show child who arrives with the intent of helping with the Great Giving day pageant, but ends up causing rebellion and turning it into a one person show about himself.
Hannah (voiced by Sami Staitman) – A girl who knows a lot about camping, but is scared of actually doing it herself, for a number of reasons. She eventually earns an honorary Care Camping stamp.

Episodes

Movie 
Care Bears: A Belly Badge for Wonderheart the Movie was released on home video formats on August 6, 2013. Though marketed as a direct-to-video feature-length film, the release consists of no newly produced material, but is rather a compilation of three previous installments of the television series featuring the character Wonderheart Bear, edited to run in sequence at feature length.

Cast 
 Michaela Dean as Wonderheart Bear
 Doug Erholtz as Grumpy Bear, Champ Bear, Beastly and Beastie #2
 David Lodge as Tenderheart Bear, Great Giving Bear and Shiver Me Timbear
 Patty Mattson as Cheer Bear
 Stephanie Sheh as Share Bear, Baby Tugs, Laugh-a-Lot Bear and Secret Bear
 Michael Sinterniklaas as Funshine Bear, Bedtime Bear, Birthday Bear and Beastie #1
 Nayo Wallace as Harmony Bear and Love-a-Lot Bear
 Peter Anderson - Good Luck Bear
 Jennifer Darling - Grams Bear
 Olivia Hack as Best Friend Bear, Baby Hugs, Sweet Dreams Bear and Kaylee
 Melissa Mable as Thanks-a-Lot Bear, Surprise Bear
 Katherine Shepler as Penny, Jayden, Riley, Isabella
 Isabella Briscoe as Phoebe
 Sean-Ryan Petersen as Clem and Ethan
 Mason Maliana as Zack
 Zoe Miner as Olivia
 Rachel Albrecht as Joy
 Sami Staitman as Susan and Hannah
 Chiara Zanni as Madison
 Sam Adler as Peter
 Collin Depula as Aiden

Crew 
 Michael Hack – Voice Director
 Joseph Garcia – Storyboard Artist
 Mark Maxey – Storyboard Artist
 Arun Roshan Jacob – line producer
 Liz Young – supervising producer

Toyline 
Partnering with American Greetings, Hasbro released a toy line based on the series in 2013. The license transitioned to Just Play in 2015, and by quarter 2 the company produced a line of Care Bears plush (8" bean bag plush, 12" medium plush packaged with DVDs featuring episodes of "Welcome to Care-a-Lot," 16" jumbo plush, and Sing-along animatronic plush), action figures (5-packs exclusive to Toys R Us, a 14-pack at Target, as well 2-packs exclusively available in the UK), and as of Spring 2018, 6 series of small blind bag figurines based on Welcome to Care-a-Lot and Care Bears & Cousins' style guide and characters. In Summer of 2016 Just Play's merchandise transitioned to the Care Bears & Cousins branding.

Reception 
The premiere of the series, along with Kaijudo: Rise of the Duel Masters, saw The Hub earn its best performances amongst targeted demographics in six months. In an early review of the series, Blogfully.net stated that "If you've never seen a Care Bear's  episode on the Hub, you're missing out."

Cartoon Brew reported that "The Hub's earlier series, My Little Pony: Friendship is Magic, sparked an unlikely following among adult males, otherwise known as the Brony phenomenon, but one fandom isn't enough for the Hub. They think their Care Bears show needs an adult male fanbase, too, and they're shamelessly encouraging it themselves." Comics Alliance also said that "In case you're wondering, "Belly-Bros" is a term offered by the Hub as a potential name for the legions of male fans who'll enjoy this new Care Bears series as much as they do Friendship is Magic. If you're not feeling it, however, they're also suggesting "Care-Dudes," which sounds more like the way that William S. Preston would describe someone who works in an assisted living facility." In a statement in response to these articles, The Hub's Crystal Williams said, "...I came across your story on Cartoon Brew titled "The Hub Hopes Men Will Start Calling Themselves "Belly Bros" and "Care Dudes." In response, I wanted to let you know that this was an unapproved and unsanctioned pitch by our PR agency...The Hub TV Network nor American Greetings Properties had any knowledge of the pitch angle. It is not our intention to compare Care Bears to My Little Pony and/or the Brony community."

References

External links 
 

2012 American television series debuts
2012 American television series endings
2010s American animated television series
Care Bears (television series)
Television shows based on Hasbro toys
American children's animated adventure television series
American children's animated fantasy television series
American children's animated musical television series
American computer-animated television series
Television series by Splash Entertainment
English-language television shows
Animated television series about bears
Discovery Family original programming